Daniel William Keane (born 21 March 1951) is a New Zealand rower.

Keane was born in 1951 in Hamilton, New Zealand. He represented New Zealand at the 1976 Summer Olympics. He is listed as New Zealand Olympian athlete number 354 by the New Zealand Olympic Committee. Keane now lives in Whitianga on the Coromandel Peninsula.

References

1951 births
Living people
New Zealand male rowers
Rowers at the 1976 Summer Olympics
Olympic rowers of New Zealand
Sportspeople from Waikato
People from Whitianga
World Rowing Championships medalists for New Zealand